Geislingen is a town in the Zollernalbkreis district of Baden-Württemberg, Germany. It is situated 4 km northwest of Balingen. The population stands at roughly 6,000. Geislingen includes three smaller towns, Geislingen (pop. 4,500), Erlaheim (pop. 500), and Binsdorf (pop. 1,000), all of them growing about 1% per year. The area has been continuously settled since the Stone Age. The first written documentation of Binsdorf came in 834, Geislingen was officially mentioned in 1188. The local economy mixes agriculture with services and small-scale industry. Many residents work in industrial areas south of Stuttgart or in nearby Balingen.

History 
In 1764 Carl von Ulm zu Erbach take care by Decretum für das Amt Beeder Herrschaften Werenwag und Callenberg for the Poor. Contributing Textile production.
 
Württemberg planted an alley of fruit trees. (dienstbarkeit). The tree farms of Wilhelm and the Brüdergemeinde provided free fruit. In 1863 those fruits included Luiken, Winterlinge, Fleiner, Knausbirnen, Bratbirnen, Glöcklesbirnen, Fäßlesbirnen, Grunbirnen, Lederäpfel, Breitlinge, Goldparmäne, Rosenäpfel, Zuckerbirnen and Bergamottbirnen. 

In 1941, there was a protest against the Nazi Party in Geislingen.

In 1990 Erlaheim a fruit tree arboretum was created.

Mining 
Sand, sandstone, limestone, gagat, and iron ore were the primary products. The Goldhöhle  mine was in Erlaheim near Mildersbach, Schwefelkies, in Geislingen. It later collapsed. Binsdorf, had a natural stone quarry. 
The  information panels near the Goldhöhle  sponsored by the Kreissparkasse. An old story talks about the Sandmann, a hawker for cleaning sand. The idea was born at the Schwäbischer Albverein in Binsdorf. From a 3.5 km mine in Doggererzflöz in Weilheim is wood in the Tuttlinger Fruchtkasten. Steel was produced in Tuttlingen by the Schwäbische Hüttenwerke in Ludwigshal.

The refinery in Harras was closed in 1832. The long, tedious transport with horses limited the amount of income from pyrite mining in Erlaheim. Economic reforms that allowed the construction of new railways made mining the iron ore of that area unprofitable. Near Geislingen, black stone (coal) was mined for Operation Desert (German fuel project) on the road to Erzingen.
Geislingen was also a center for gagat manufacturing. Gagat is broken in Posidonia Shale.

Notables

 Michael Sattler, a leader of the Anabaptist movement in the early 16th century, was a prisoner in the tower of Binsdorf before being executed at Rottenburg am Neckar.
 Anna Funk (born in Erlaheim (Erla unter Rosenfeld), died 1587) not guilty in fire as witch

References

Württemberg